Saukiella is a genus of trilobites of the Saukiidae family.

These fast-moving low-level epifaunal deposit feeders lived in the Cambrian and Ordovician periods, from 498.5 to 478.6 Ma.

Species
 Saukiella baikadamica Ergaliev 1980
 Saukiella diversa Qiu 1984
 Saukiella pepinensis (Owen, 1852) (syn. Dikelocephalus pepinensis)

Distribution
Fossils of species within this genus have been found in the Ordovician sediments of Russia and in the Cambrian sediments of Canada, China, Kazakhstan and United States.

References

Saukiidae
Asaphida genera
Cambrian first appearances
Ordovician extinctions
Trilobites of Europe
Trilobites of North America
Paleozoic life of Alberta